Prof. Satyavrata Siddhantalankar (1898–1992) was an Indian educationist and parliamentarian. He was the Vice-Chancellor of the Gurukul Kangri Vishwavidyalaya and wrote a number of books on education & social science. He was nominated as a member of Rajya Sabha in 1964 and served till 1968.

Sources
Brief Biodata

Nominated members of the Rajya Sabha
1898 births
1992 deaths
Scholars from Uttarakhand
20th-century Indian educational theorists
20th-century Indian politicians